Scopula fulvicolor is a moth of the  family Geometridae. It is found in Yemen (Socotra).

References

Moths described in 1899
fulvicolor
Endemic fauna of Socotra
Moths of Asia